Gordon Brendan Kearney (5 February 1885 – 2 May 1957) was an Australian rules footballer who played with Geelong and Essendon in the Victorian Football League (VFL).

Notes

External links 

1885 births
1957 deaths
Australian rules footballers from Victoria (Australia)
Geelong Football Club players
Essendon Football Club players
People educated at Geelong College